Sevlid Hurtić (born 1970) is a Bosnian politician serving as Minister of Human Rights and Refugees since January 2023 as part of the Cabinet of Borjana Krišto. He is the founder and president of the Bosnian-Herzegovinian Greens (BH Greens), as well as a member of the coalition Pokret za državu (Homeland Movement), representing it in the National Assembly of Republika Srpska (RS).

Career 
Hurtić was born in Doboj in 1970, where he finished elementary and secondary education. He completed undergraduate studies in economics in 2015 and obtained a PhD in 2019.

He served as Minister of Commerce and Tourism in the Government of RS. In the 2018 general elections, he filed legal complaints due to receiving exactly zero votes in the voting booths 1 and 2 of the electoral district 5 Doboj, despite party members and others having voted there.

On 11 March 2021, he was elected President of the City Council of Doboj, as a member of the coalition Doboj u srcu (Doboj is in our hearts). The coalition was composed of the Independent List Doboj - Sevlid Hurtić (now BH Greens), DF, SBB, and several independent candidates.

On 11 January 2023, SNSD and SDP suggested him for the position of Minister of Human Rights and Refugees.

He is the owner of the company Nam d.o.o.

References 

Bosnia and Herzegovina politicians
Living people
1970 births

People from Doboj